Luke Saville (born 1 February 1994) is an Australian professional tennis player. He has had success as a doubles player where he reached his highest ranking of World No. 23 on 8 November 2021. Saville reached the final at the 2020 Australian Open, partnering with fellow Australian Max Purcell.

As a junior, Saville enjoyed a successful career in which he won two junior grand slam singles titles at the 2011 Wimbledon Championships and 2012 Australian Open respectively. Saville is also a former junior World No. 1 and an Australian Institute of Sport scholarship holder. In January 2013, he competed in his first ATP main draw event at the 2013 Australian Open, but has struggled in transitioning from Juniors onto the professional circuit, reaching his highest singles ranking of World No. 152.

Personal life
Saville was born in Berri, South Australia. He is a keen supporter of the Carlton in the Australian Football League. He has a brother Troy and a sister Katie, who also play club tennis. His relationship with now-wife Russian-born Australian tennis player, Daria Gavrilova influenced her decision to become an Australian citizen.

Junior career
Saville began to compete in big junior events at the start of 2009, when he was given wildcards into G1 tournaments in Australia. He only managed to reach round 16 in both tournaments, being taken out by James Duckworth and Nikala Scholtz. Saville had no titles at the start of the Australian Open 2009. He beat Greivis Valadziemer, but lost to Dino Marcan in three sets. Later in 2009, Saville was a part of the victorious Australian Junior Davis Cup Team with teammates Jason Kubler and Joey Swaysland.

Saville had a great start to the 2011 with a run against Adam Pavlásek, Dominic Thiem, Nikola Milojević, Lucas Pouille, and Roberto Carballés to reach the final of the 2011 Australian Open, but losing to Jiří Veselý in straight sets in the final.

Saville then won the junior 2011 Wimbledon title, beating Lucas Vrnac, Evgyny Lovskiy, Thiago Moura Monteiro, Joris De Looreand, and Kaichi Uchida on his way to the final. He then defeated home player Liam Broady in three sets.

In 2012, Saville once again made it to the final of the junior Australian Open, where he beat opponent Filip Peliwo in three sets. He became the first Australian to win the Australian Open juniors title since Bernard Tomic in 2008. Later that year, Saville reached the final of 2012 Wimbledon Championships, where he again faced Filip Peliwo. He lost in straight sets.

As a junior, Saville posted a singles win–loss record of 96–39 (and 65–38 in doubles), reaching the no. 1 combined world ranking in January 2012.

Junior singles titles (5)

Professional career

2008–2011: Professional tour debut
Saville entered his first professional event in October 2008 as a 14-year-old. The event was held in his home state of South Australia. Saville was awarded a bye in the first round of qualifying but lost in the second round to Ben Mitchell 5–7, 0–6.

Saville competed in his first main draw of a futures tournament in February 2009 when he was awarded a wildcard into a futures tournament in Mildura, he fell in the first round to Miles Armstrong 5–7, 0–6. The following week he was awarded a second wildcard into the main draw of a futures tournament held in Berri, South Australia, the birthplace of Saville. He would lose in the first round to Matt Reid 4–6, 4–6. In preparation for the junior Davis Cup finals Saville was awarded his third wildcard into a futures event held in Darwin. As a fifteen-year-old he won his first round against Steven Goh 7–6(3), 6–3 and in doing so earned his first ever ATP ranking points as well as becoming the youngest player on the ATP rankings. Saville would go on to lose to John Millman in the second round 2–6, 0–6.

Saville was awarded a wildcard into the 2010 Australian Open qualifying draw where he fell in the first round to Frenchman Alexandre Sidorenko 1–6, 1–6. Following the Australian Open Saville was awarded a wildcard into his first ever challenger event in Burnie, he went down gallantly in three sets to Dayne Kelly 6–4, 3–6, 4–6. In March Saville traveled to Spain to train at the AIS headquarters and in doing so entered a Spanish futures tournament, he would lose in the first round of qualifying. On return to Australia Saville continued to play clay court tournaments leading up to the Roland Garros juniors by receiving wildcards into future tournaments in Ipswich and Bundaberg respectively. He would reach the second round of both tournaments. Saville entered three more Australian future tournaments later that year but failed to make it past the first round.

Saville once again began his year with a wildcard into the Australian Open qualifying but failed to make it past the first round after losing to Nicolas Mahut in the first round. Following his runner up appearance at the Australian Open juniors he was once again granted a wildcard into the challenger held in Burnie but fell in the first round to Paolo Lorenzi. Throughout the rest of the year Saville competed in futures tournaments across Australia, Thailand, Italy, Netherlands, Great Britain and USA but failed to make it past the first round of the main draw in all tournaments. He would hit some form at the end of 2011 where he made his first ever professional quarterfinal in the last future tournament of the year held in Australia. Saville would finish the year ranked 1,176 in the world.

2012
Saville was awarded qualifying wildcards into the events held in Brisbane, Sydney, and the Australian Open. In Brisbane, Saville reached the second round of qualifying, after defeating Alex Bolt, 6–4, 1–6, 6–3, but later fell to Tatsuma Ito in the second round, 2–6, 2–6. In Sydney qualifying, Saville was knocked out in the first round by Andre Begemann, 4–6, 4–6. Saville lost in the first round of Australian Open qualifying, going down to Ivo Minář, 6–7(3), 1–6.

2013
Saville began his year by losing in the opening rounds of qualifying at both the 2013 Brisbane International and Sydney International to John Millman and Tatsuma Ito, his first top 100 opponent. Saville was awarded a wild card into the 2013 Australian Open. In his ATP main draw debut, he lost in round one to Japanese Go Soeda in four sets. After a number of early round losses in futures and challenger tournaments in Australia, Japan and the United States. After a number of early losses, Saville made the final of the USA futures F10 event in Little Rock. He lost in straight sets to Austin Krajicek.

From May to August, Saville competed in tournaments throughout Asia and North America, with a record of five wins to seven losses. His top result being in the Korea futures F5 event where he reached the quarterfinals. In September, Saville returned to form competing in Australian Futures tournaments. He reached the semifinal at the F6 event in Toowoomba, going down to Andrew Whittington in three sets. After losing in the second round of the Australia F7 in Cairns, he again won through to a semifinal at the Australia F8 tournament in Alice Springs. He lost to Jordan Thompson in a third set tiebreak. After a first round loss in the Australia F9 tournament in Sydney to Blake Mott, Saville won his first title of the year at the Australia F10 event in Sydney. He defeated Yasutaka Uchiyama in a three set final. He was forced to withdraw from his match with Jordan Thompson with a hamstring injury. Saville then returned to the challenger circuit with first round and second round losses in the 2013 Melbourne Challenger and the Traralgon ATP Challenger. In November, Saville made the final of the Thailand F4, but lost to Yasutaka Uchiyama in three sets. He lost to Uchiyama again in round 2 the following week in the Thailand F5. Saville finished his year with a semifinal loss at the Australian Open Wildcard Playoff to Ben Mitchell in straight sets. Saville finished 2013 ranked World No. 398.

2014
Saville was given a wild card into qualifying at the 2014 Australian Open where he lost in the first round to Paul Capdeville in three sets. Saville then lost in the first round of the 2014 Burnie International and the second round of the 2014 Charles Sturt Adelaide International.

Saville next competed in the Australia 2014 Futures F1 event in Happy Valley where he reached the final, and went down in straights sets to Jarmere Jenkins. The next week in the Australia F2 in Port Pirie, Saville went on to win the title against Jordan Thompson after he was forced to withdraw while Saville led by a set and a break. Saville then claimed another title in the Australia F3 event in Mildura with a three set win over Dane Propoggia. After losing in the second round of the Australia F4 event, Saville went on to win his third Futures title of the year in Glen Iris. Saville defeated Alex Bolt in the final in a match where he was forced to save multiple match points. Saville's run of form in the futures tournaments lifted his ranking from World No. 397 to No. 250.

In May, Saville, made the quarterfinals of the Gimcheon Challenger, but lost to eventual finalist Tatsuma Ito. This was his best result at a Challenger tour event. Saville scored his first top 100 win against top seed Thomaz Bellucci in the first round of qualifying at the 2014 Wimbledon Championships. After defeating Rhyne Williams in three sets, Saville won a long five set final round against Yann Marti which meant he had qualified for the main draw. This would be just his second main draw ATP match of his career. In the first round, he prevailed against Dominic Thiem in four sets. This was his first win in a major championship and as a result, he broke into the top 200 for the first time. He lost to Grigor Dimitrov in the second round. Saville played his final grass court tournament for the year at the 2014 Hall of Fame Tennis Championships in Newport. He defeated Sarvar Ikramov and Hiroki Moriya to qualify for his third ATP main draw. He defeated Peter Polansky in straight sets before losing to Nicolas Mahut in the second round.

In July, Saville sustained a lower back issue in the quarterfinals of the Granby Challenger. This injury sidelined him from the US Open and competition for almost three months. Saville returned from injury in October and made the final of the Australia futures F8 event, but lost to Jarmere Jenkins in straight sets. Saville reached the quarterfinals of the 2014 Traralgon ATP Challenger 1, going down to John-Patrick Smith, after taking the first set. He then reached the semifinals of the 2014 Traralgon ATP Challenger 2, before losing to eventual champion John Millman. This result gave him a career high ranking of World No. 158. He lost in the first round of the Toyota Challenger in a third set tiebreak to Mao-Xin Gong. Saville finished the year at the Australian Open Wildcard Playoff where he reached the semifinal. He was forced to withdraw from his match with Jordan Thompson with a hamstring injury. Saville finished the year with a ranking of World No. 164.

2015: Career-high in singles, First and second Challenger finals
Saville was given a wild card into the 2015 Australian Open, where he lost in round 1 to Tim Smyczek in straight sets. In February, Saville reached the quarter final of the 2015 Delhi Open. As a result, he reached a career-high in singles of World No. 152 on 23 February 2015.

In May, Saville made the second round of French Open qualifying.
In June, Saville made his first final on the ATP Challenger Tour, losing to compatriot Sam Groth in the Manchester Challenger. Following that, Saville qualified for Wimbledon for the second year in a row, saving a match point and fighting back from two sets down to defeat higher-ranked Italian Luca Vanni in the final round of qualifying. Saville lost in the first round to 21st seed Richard Gasquet in straight sets. In August, Saville won the USA F24 title against Kevin King, but lost in round 1 of qualifying for the US Open to Karen Khachanov.

In October, Saville returned to Australia where he made the final of the Brisbane F9, losing to Gavin van Peperzeel in three sets 6–7, 6–2, 6–7. He made the final of the Canberra International but lost to Benjamin Mitchell 7–5, 0–6, 1–6. Saville finished the year with a ranking of world number 174.

2016: Loss of form in singles
Saville lost in round one of qualifying for the 2016 Apia International Sydney and 2016 Australian Open. In February, Saville made the semi-final of the 2016 Launceston Tennis International before heading to Asia where he played in a number of Challenger tournaments, with limited success. In May, Saville lost in round 1 of qualifying for the 2016 French Open. In June, Saville made the quarter final of the Surbiton Challenger before qualifying for the 2016 Wimbledon Championships for the third year in a row  Saville finished the year with a ranking of world number 266.

2017: Continued struggles in singles, Resurgence in doubles and top 150 debut
After a disappointing 2016 campaign, Saville admitted that the pressure of expectations had gotten to him in the past, but was "finding his mojo" again after reuniting with former coach Des Tyson. Despite his hopes, 2017 was a disaster year for Saville, who posted just nine main draw singles wins on the Challenger and Futures circuit and failed to make it past the second round at any tournament. Saville also failed to feature in a grand slam main draw since 2012. As a result, Saville's ranking plummeted to World No. 521 in singles to close out the year, his worst year-end ranking since 2011.

Despite having an unsuccessful year in singles, Saville managed to make seven Challenger doubles finals in 2017, winning once. He finished the season ranked World No. 130 in doubles.

2018: Three doubles Challengers titles, New partnership with Max Purcell
Saville commenced the 2018 year on the Australian Challenger circuit, with limited success. In March, Saville reached the final of the Australia F1, losing to Marc Polmans. It was Saville's first singles final in over 2 years. Saville travelled to Asia and qualified for 2 Challenger main draws from 5 attempts. Saville experiences similar limited success across Europe and North American challenger circuit, his best result being a quarterfinal appearance at the Columbus Challenger in September.
In October, he reached the first Challenger final with new partner fellow Australian Max Purcell in Traralgon, Australia. In November, the duo went on to win their first Challenger in Bangalore, India.

2020: First Grand Slam doubles final and second ATP final
At the 2020 Australian Open, he paired with Max Purcell as a wildcard in doubles, where they reached the final losing to 11th seeded pair American Rajeev Ram and Brit Joe Salisbury. The pair also reached their second final of the season of the 2020 Astana Open where they lost to Belgians Sander Gillé/Joran Vliegen.

2021: French and Wimbledon Open doubles third rounds, Olympics singles and doubles debut, top 25 in doubles
At the Olympics, Saville was entered as a last-minute alternate for Hungarian Márton Fucsovics who had withdrawn due to right shoulder injury. He also participated in the doubles competition with John Millman.

After reaching the third rounds at the 2021 French Open, 2021 Wimbledon Championships, and the quarterfinals of the Canada Masters 1000 in the 2021 National Bank Open edition, he reached the top 30 in doubles at World No. 28 on 16 August 2021.

Significant finals

Grand Slam tournament finals

Doubles: 1 (1 runner-up)

ATP career finals

Doubles: 5 (5 runner-ups)

Challenger and Futures finals

Singles: 19 (8–11)

Doubles: 39 (25–14)

Junior Grand Slam finals

Singles: 4 (2 titles, 2 runners-up)

Performance timelines

Singles

Doubles

References

External links
 
 
 
 Luke Saville at the Australian Open
 Luke Saville at the French Open
 Luke Saville at The Championships, Wimbledon

1994 births
Living people
Australian male tennis players
Wimbledon junior champions
Tennis people from South Australia
Australian Institute of Sport tennis players
Australian Open (tennis) junior champions
Grand Slam (tennis) champions in boys' singles
Olympic tennis players of Australia
Tennis players at the 2020 Summer Olympics
21st-century Australian people
Sportsmen from South Australia